|}

The Road to the Kentucky Derby Conditions Stakes is a flat horse race in Great Britain open to three-year-old horses. It is run at Kempton Park over a distance of 1 mile (1,609 meters) and is scheduled to take place in March.

The race was first run in 2018 as part of the Road to the Kentucky Derby series through which horses earn points to qualify for a place in the Kentucky Derby.

Winners

See also 
Horse racing in Great Britain
List of British flat horse races
Cardinal Stakes

References 

Racing Post:

Flat races in Great Britain
Kempton Park Racecourse
Flat horse races for three-year-olds
Recurring sporting events established in 2018
2018 establishments in England